Charles Richard Montague Ede (22 October 1921 – 29 May 2002) was the founder of The Folio Society.

During World War II, Ede was commissioned into the Royal Tank Regiment and saw service at the Siege of Malta, Palestine, Egypt, and Italy, before transferring to the Intelligence Corps.

After the War, instead of going up to Oxford University as originally intended, he registered with the London School of Printing and after completing his course founded The Folio Society in 1947.

In 1971 Ede sold his share in The Folio Society and set up as an ancient art dealer. The eponymous dealership, Charles Ede Ltd. continues to offer the highest level of scholarship and material at their Mayfair gallery in the heart of London, and at eminent international art fairs such as TEFAF Maastricht and TEFAF New York.

Selected publications
The Art of the Book: some record of work carried out in Europe and the U.S.A. 1939-1950. London: Studio Publications, 1951.
Collecting Antiquities: An introductory guide. London; Dent, 1976.

References

External links
Charles Ede Ltd. – Ancient Art Antiquities Gallery
 

1921 births
2002 deaths
People from Sevenoaks
British publishers (people)
British Army personnel of World War II
Royal Tank Regiment officers
Intelligence Corps officers
20th-century English businesspeople
Military personnel from Kent